Jean Pierre Duvieusart (10 April 1900 – 10 October 1977) was a Belgian politician of the PSC-CVP who served as prime minister of Belgium from June to August in 1950.

Political career

Jean Duvieusart became a member of the Chamber of Representatives in 1944, serving until 1949, when he became a member of the Senate.

Duvieusart served as minister of Economic affairs (1947-1950 en 1952-1954).

In 1950 he served two months as the 36th Prime Minister of Belgium but he resigned after the abdication of King Leopold III.

He was president of the European Parliament (1964–1965).

He left the PSC in 1965 and became president of the Rassemblement wallon and the Front Démocratique des Bruxellois Francophones (FDF) (1968–1972).

Personal life
On 8 July 1930, Duvieusart married Blanche Dijon (18 November 1907 – 24 February 1984) and had three sons and one  daughter, Philippe (born 1932), Léopold (born 1933), Étienne (born 1935) and Thérèse (1939).

See also
 Royal Question, Belgium

References

External links
 Jean Duvieusart in ODIS - Online Database for Intermediary Structures 

1900 births
1977 deaths
Christian Social Party (Belgium, defunct) MEPs
People from Hainaut (province)
Prime Ministers of Belgium
Presidents of the European Parliament
Walloon movement activists
Walloon people